Katangaia is an African genus of flies in the family Dolichopodidae. It was originally placed in the subfamily Rhaphiinae, though it was later transferred to Dolichopodinae. In 2005, based on a cladistic analysis of the subfamily, Scott E. Brooks excluded Katangaia from the Dolichopodinae. However, later authors have retained the genus in this subfamily.

Species 
 Katangaia ethiopiensis (Grichanov, 2004) – Ethiopia
 Katangaia longifacies Parent, 1933 – Democratic Republic of the Congo, possibly Tanzania
 Katangaia mulanjensis (Grichanov, 2004) - Malawi
 Katangaia tanzaniensis Grichanov, 2012 – Tanzania

References 

Dolichopodidae genera
Dolichopodinae
Diptera of Africa